Munich School is the name given to a group of painters who worked in Munich or were trained at the Royal Academy of Fine Arts of Munich between 1850 and 1918. In the second half of the 19th century the Academy became one of the most important institutions in Europe for training artists and attracted students from across Europe and the United States.

History and representative artists
Munich was an important center of painting and visual art in the period between 1850 and 1914. The mid-century movement away from the Romanticism and emphasis on fresco painting of the earlier Munich school was led by Karl von Piloty, who was a professor at the Munich Academy from 1856 and became its director in 1874. Piloty's approach to history painting was influenced by the French academician Paul Delaroche, and by the painterly colorism of Rubens and the Venetians.
Besides Piloty, other influential teachers at the Academy were Wilhelm von Diez (1839–1907), Wilhelm von Kaulbach, Arthur von Ramberg and Nikolaos Gyzis.

Artists of the Munich School include Anton Braith, Alfred Kowalski, Hans Makart, Gabriel Max, Victor Müller, Fritz Osswald, Franz von Lenbach, Friedrich Kaulbach, Wilhelm Leibl, Wilhelm Trübner, and the genre painters Franz Defregger, Eduard von Grützner, Hermann von Kaulbach and Miroslav Kraljević.

The last generation of students of the Munich School included nearly all the major figures of the German avantgarde, such as Lovis Corinth, Ernst Oppler, Vassily Kandinsky, Paul Klee and Franz Marc.

Beyond Bavaria
There were notable schools of Munich-trained painters active outside of Germany. The formative influence of teachers and examples of the Munich School shaped the academic naturalism in many European countries, e.g. the Greek academic art of the 19th century. Due to the historical affinity between Bavaria and Greece—Prince Otto I was from 1832 to 1862 the first King of Greece—many Greek artists were trained in Munich. The Munich School in Greek art is the most important artistic movement of Greek Art in the 19th century with strong influences from the Academy of Munich. Among the leading artists of this school were Konstantinos Volanakis, Georgios Roilos, Nikolaos Gyzis, Polychronis Lembesis, Nikolaos Vokos, Nikiphoros Lytras and Georgios Jakobides. 
 
Most of the artists of the Hungarian Nagybanya school of art, such as Gyula Aggházy, were educated in Munich.

Poland was represented by, among others, Józef Chełmoński, Józef Brandt, Władysław Czachórski, Julian Fałat, Aleksander Gierymski, Maksymilian Gierymski and Alfred Wierusz-Kowalski.

The Swedish painters Johan Christoffer Boklund and Johan Fredrik Höckert studied in Munich.

The founder of historical painting in Armenia - Vardges Sureniants - was a representative of the Munich School.

Americans in Munich: Joseph Frank Currier "figured prominently in the Munich School", ; with, "exceptional power and originality", . Frank Duveneck and William Merritt Chase were the most prominent exemplars of the Munich School in American art. Other American artists who studied in Munich include Harry Chase, Robert Koehler, John Henry Twachtman, and Walter Shirlaw.

Style
The Munich school is characterized by a naturalistic style and dark chiaroscuro. Typical subjects are landscape, portraits, genre, still-life, and history painting.

Notes

References

Brooklyn Museum, Triumph of Realism: an exhibition of European and American realist paintings,1850–1910. University of California, 1967.
Greenville County Museum of Art, and Martha R. Severens. Greenville County Museum of Art: The Southern Collection. New York: Hudson Hills Press, in association with the Greenville County Museum of Art, 1995. 
Norman, Geraldine, Nineteenth-Century Painters and Painting: A Dictionary. Berkeley: University of California Press, 1978.

External links 
Münchner Schule
Münchner Schule bei Ketterer

 
German art movements
German artist groups and collectives
American art movements
Culture in Munich
Arts in Greece